Khalil bin Abd al-Rahman al-Qari (1361 AH / 1940 - 23 Dhu al-Hijjah 1439 AH / 3 September 2018), was the Sheikh of the Imams of the Two Holy Mosques, and is considered one of the founders of the modern Qur’anic renaissance.

Khalil Al-Qari was born in Muzaffarabad in 1940, and studied under Sheikh Muhammad Suleiman in Lahore, and under the reciter Anwar Al-Haq. He memorized the Qur’an from Sheikh Fadl Karim, then he studied the “Qira’at” on the “Qura’a” of Pakistan. In Pakistan he worked as a radio presenter in the Muzaffarabad region.

In 1963 he immigrated to Makkah Al-Mukarramah, and studied at the Bin Laden Mosque and the Masjid al-Haram. He taught at the Grand Mosque, and the Al-Arqam Bin Abi Al-Arqam Institute in Al-Safa. Then he moved to Madinah, and was appointed a teacher at the Madinah Institute of the Imam Muhammad Ibn Saud Islamic University, where he settled and devoted himself to teaching the Qur’an.

He was called the "Sheikh of the Imams of the Two Holy Mosques"; In reference to the fact that six of his former students served as Imams of the Great Mosque of Mecca, along with other well-known students, including Sheikh Muhammad Ayyub and Sheikh Ali Jaber.

He is considered the pioneer of the Hijazi school in reciting the Qur’an, and one of the founders who participated in the establishment of charitable societies for the memorization of the Qur’an in Saudi Arabia. He is the father of Muhammad and Mahmoud, the Imams of the Prophet's Mosque.

Death 
He died on Monday 23 Dhu al-Hijjah 1439 AH corresponding to September 3, 2018, in Medina, at the age of 78, and was buried at dawn in Al-Baqi Cemetery.

References

1940 births
2018 deaths
People from Medina
Saudi Arabian people of Pakistani descent
Pakistani Quran reciters
Saudi Arabian Sunni Muslim scholars of Islam
Academic staff of Imam Muhammad ibn Saud Islamic University
Burials at Jannat al-Baqī